Francisco Garrigos Rosa (born 9 December 1994) is a Spanish judoka. He competed at the 2016 Summer Olympics in the men's 60 kg event, in which he was eliminated in the second round by Tobias Englmaier.

In 2020, he won one of the bronze medals in the men's 60 kg event at the 2020 European Judo Championships held in Prague, Czech Republic.

References

External links
  
 
 
 
 

1994 births
Living people
Spanish male judoka
Olympic judoka of Spain
Judoka at the 2016 Summer Olympics
People from Móstoles
Sportspeople from the Community of Madrid
Mediterranean Games gold medalists for Spain
Mediterranean Games medalists in judo
Competitors at the 2018 Mediterranean Games
Competitors at the 2022 Mediterranean Games
Judoka at the 2015 European Games
Judoka at the 2019 European Games
European Games medalists in judo
European Games silver medalists for Spain
Judoka at the 2020 Summer Olympics
21st-century Spanish people